Hohenhameln is a municipality in the district of Peine, in Lower Saxony, Germany. It is situated approximately 15 km southwest of Peine, 15 km northeast of Hildesheim and 25 km southeast of Hanover.

Places that belong to the Hohenhameln community
Hohenhameln, Soßmar, Clauen, Bierbergen, Bründeln, Equord, Harber, Mehrum, Ohlum, Rötzum, Stedum

Twinnings
 Hankasalmi, Finland

References

Peine (district)